Matthias Haddad (born 10 March 2001) is a French rugby union player, currently playing in the back row for Top 14 side La Rochelle.

Honours

Club 
 La Rochelle
European Rugby Champions Cup: 2021–2022

References

External links
 La Rochelle profile
 

2001 births
Living people
French rugby union players
Stade Rochelais players
Rugby union flankers
Sportspeople from La Rochelle